Pyotr Aleksandrovich Brayko (Cyrillic: Пётр Александрович Брайко; born 27 March 1977 in Leningrad, Soviet Union) is a retired Russian athlete who specialised in the high jump. He represented his country at two consecutive Summer Olympics, in 2000 and 2004, failing to qualify for the final at both occasions.

He has personal bests of 2.30 metres outdoors and 2.31 metres indoors, both set in 2002.

Competition record

References

1977 births
Living people
Russian male high jumpers
Athletes (track and field) at the 2000 Summer Olympics
Athletes (track and field) at the 2004 Summer Olympics
Olympic athletes of Russia
Athletes from Saint Petersburg